Whitikahu is a settlement scattered along Whitikahu Rd in the Waikato District and Waikato region of New Zealand's North Island.

It has a blueberry farm, a winery, the Senton Sawmill, a fire station, a petrol station and a hall.

It is in the Hukanui Waerenga Ward of Waikato District Council.

Geology 
Pukemokemoke hill is formed of greywacke of the Jurassic Manaia Hill Group (shown as Jm on map). The rest of the Whitikahu area is largely on a drained peat bog, which lies on ash from Lake Taupo.

Taupiri Fault is an inferred fault separating the peat from the Taupiri Range. Seismic testing in 2017 added evidence of the fault's position.

Whitikahu is at the north end of an alluvial fan of the ash, which drops about 60 m (200 ft) from Karapiro.

After the Oruanui eruption, some 26,500 years ago, Lake Taupo was about 145 m (476 ft) above the present lake. Around 22,500 years ago the ash dam eroded rapidly and the lake fell about 75 m (246 ft) in a few weeks, creating a series of massive floods. The ash they carried formed the main Hinuera Surface (Q2a) into the fan.

From then until about 17,600 years ago the Waikato would have been about 25 m (82 ft) higher than at present due to aggradation, resulting from remobilisation of pyroclastic material from Taupo, deposited as well-bedded, creamy-white pumice sands, silts and gravels with charcoal fragments.

One of its channels from that period followed the Mangawara Stream via the present air-gap at Mangawara. This earlier gorge was buried beneath alluvium but has since been partly re-exposed by the Mangawara Stream as the Waikato has deepened Taupiri gorge.

The Waikato eroded its present valley for about 3,500 years, at a time when the sea was around 100 m (330 ft) below its present level. The Walton Sub-Group (eQa) of pumiceous fine- grained sand and silt with interbedded peat, pumiceous gravelly sand, diatomaceous mud, and non-welded ignimbrite and tephra formed low hills, up to 50 m above the Hamilton Basin plain, on and around which younger sediments have been deposited. In this area they are named the Puketoka Formation. It is highly pumiceous, and, due to silica case-hardening, is able to form vertical bluffs, now weathered, eroded, dissected and largely buried by younger sediments.

Taupo Formation (Q1a) was laid down in the trench cut through the Hinuera surface. Taupo Formation alluvium is the top layer on which most of the peat bogs formed.

History and culture

Pre-European history
From the 1600s: Ngati Koura and Ngati Wairere Waikai occupied the area, mainly for eel fishing. An old waka was discovered in 1937.

European settlement

After the invasion of the Waikato, the area was confiscated in 1863 and cut up into lots for the military settlers, though deemed too swampy for occupation. In 1873 the  Tauhei Block was returned to the hapū to farm.

Much of the area was in the Eureka Estate, which the New Zealand Loan and Mercantile Agency bought from the government in 1874. It was then owned by the Waikato Land Association, later known as NZ Land Association. Its  extended from Te Hoe to Tauwhare and Tamahere. In 1876 Whitikahu was described as a deep swamp, but a condition of the sale was that NZLMA should build drains and roads. Kauri gum was being dug in 1893, when about half the area had been drained.

20th century

Flax was milled in the area from 1890 until a 1908 fire and again from 1918. A new Orini mill opened in 1936 and flax was still being grown in 1938, when there was another fire. The drained peat has also caught fire from time to time.

By 1912 over 30 voters were recorded, there was a twice-weekly post delivery and there were three sheep farms.

Electricity came in 1923. A hall was built and a bus service to Hamilton, started in 1937 and was still running in 1964 and into the 1970s.

Marae

The local Tauhei Marae and its Māramatutahi meeting ground are a traditional meeting place of the Waikato Tainui hapū of Ngāti Makirangi and Ngāti Wairere.

In October 2020, the Government committed $95,664 from the Provincial Growth Fund to upgrade the Tauhei Marae, creating an estimated 7 jobs.

Demographics 

Whitikahu statistical area had a population of 1,968 at the 2018 New Zealand census, an increase of 84 people (4.5%) since the 2013 census, and an increase of 174 people (9.7%) since the 2006 census. There were 645 households, comprising 990 males and 975 females, giving a sex ratio of 1.02 males per female. The median age was 33.8 years (compared with 37.4 years nationally), with 495 people (25.2%) aged under 15 years, 384 (19.5%) aged 15 to 29, 921 (46.8%) aged 30 to 64, and 168 (8.5%) aged 65 or older.

Ethnicities were 81.9% European/Pākehā, 13.1% Māori, 1.4% Pacific peoples, 12.0% Asian, and 2.1% other ethnicities. People may identify with more than one ethnicity.

The percentage of people born overseas was 15.9, compared with 27.1% nationally.

Although some people chose not to answer the census's question about religious affiliation, 51.7% had no religion, 30.2% were Christian, 0.5% had Māori religious beliefs, 2.0% were Hindu, 0.3% were Muslim, 0.6% were Buddhist and 7.2% had other religions.

Of those at least 15 years old, 225 (15.3%) people had a bachelor's or higher degree, and 288 (19.6%) people had no formal qualifications. The median income was $40,600, compared with $31,800 nationally. 321 people (21.8%) earned over $70,000 compared to 17.2% nationally. The employment status of those at least 15 was that 846 (57.4%) people were employed full-time, 276 (18.7%) were part-time, and 45 (3.1%) were unemployed.

Education 
Whitikahu School opened in 1911.

Drainage 
The drainage begun by NZLMA was continued by drainage boards set up under the Land Drainage Act 1908 and the Taupiri Drainage and River Board Empowering Act, 1936. By 1926 some of it was described as fine dairying land. In the 1930s the board aimed to drain the whole of the wetland. With government grants, they used unemployed workers to drain an area south of Te Hoe and create roads and farms from 1936 to 1938. However, although drains, floodgates and dams were built, flooding remains a problem.

The Mangatea Catchment Restoration Project, led by Tauhei Marae, aims to reduce pollution of the local streams which run into the Waikato River.  of fencing beside the Mangawara and Tauhei streams will reduce pollutants entering them.

Pukemokemoke Bush Reserve 
The greywacke here is of the Jurassic Manaia Hill Group.

The hill was logged by Roose Shipping Co from 1949, into the 1950s, but kauri, mataī, kahikatea, rimu, tōtara, tawa, rewarewa, titoki, pukatea and taraire remain and about 15,000 native trees have replaced privet and other weeds. 110 species were listed in 1962.

The neighbouring Tauhei quarry has been owned by Fulton Hogan since 2016. It was formerly operated by Perry Group for Waikato District Council. Production was increased to supply aggregates for the Waikato Expressway in 2017 and 2018.

References

External links 
 1:50,000 map
 Mangawara Stream water quality LAWA
 Mangawara Stream water level

Populated places in Waikato
Waikato District